Marianus I may refer to:

 Marianus I of Arborea (11th century)
 Marianus I of Torres (died after 18 March 1082)